An Enchanted Evening is a live album by Kitarō, released on June 29, 1995, recorded during his world tour that year. 
It features music from his studio album, Mandala, and his original score to Oliver Stone's 1993 film, Heaven and Earth.

A DVD was also released by Domo records, through Pioneer Artists (pa). With a different order and 7 tracks. "Silk road" is absent.

Track listing

Personnel
Kitaro : Producer, Keyboards, Taiko Drums, Guitar, Wooden Flute, Tibetan Long Horn, Chanting
Angus Clark : Guitar
Diana Dentino : Keyboards
Keith Heffner : Keyboards
Nawang Khechog : Flutes/Percussion/Chanting
Jeff McElroy : Bass
Lorenza Ponce : Violin
Yoshi Shimada : Drums
Derek Zimmerman : Percussion
Gary Barlough : Co-Producer
Peter Kelsey : Engineer
Erick Labson : Mastering Engineer
Art Slave : Design
Hideo Oida : Photography
Kazu Yanagi : Photography
Tour Manager: Matt Leach
Production Manager : John Warren
Guitars & Strings Tech : Ross Lahey
Key Tech : Gary Barlough
Eiichi Naito : Management
Dino Malito : Management
Frank V. Farrell : Touring Monitor Engineer

Charts

References

External links
Kitaro Official site (English)
Kitaro Official site (Japanese)
Kitaro TV - Kitaro's official YouTube page
Kitaro Facebook

Kitarō albums
1995 live albums